Hugh Stephen Murray Elliott (born 1965) is a British diplomat, currently serving as the Ambassador of the United Kingdom to Spain and non-resident Ambassador Extraordinary to Andorra since 2019. Prior to this, he was Director for Communications at the Department for Exiting the European Union.

Early life
Elliott attended Bedford School from 1973 to 1983, where his father Tim Elliott taught Spanish. He then went up to Trinity College, Cambridge where he read Modern and Medieval Languages.

Diplomatic career
Elliott joined the Foreign and Commonwealth Office in 1989 as an Assistant Desk Officer for the East Africa Department. In 1991, Elliott was posted to Madrid for five years. From 1996 to 1999 held various positions in the FCO including as the Head of the Amsterdam Treaty Unit. He was then posted to Buenos Aires for three years as Head of Economic, Political and Public Affairs. In 2002, he was in Paris as a Counsellor for Global Issues.

From 2006 to 2013, Elliott was the Head of Government Relations at Anglo American, a mining company. In 2013, he returned to the FCO as the Director of Communication, a post which he kept until 2017 when he was made the Director for Europe. In 2017, Elliott was the Director of International Agreements at the FCO and in 2018 moved to the Department for Exiting the European Union as Director of Communications and Stakeholders.

Elliott took up the post of Ambassador to Spain and non-resident Ambassador Extraordinary to Andorra in August 2019. He presented his letter of credentials to King Felipe VI on 5 September 2019.

Elliott has also served as a Trustee of the British Spanish Society and the Chairman of Canning House, an Anglo-Hispanic centre.

In 2020 he was appointed as the Patron of The Royal British Legion in Spain and the British Benevolent Fund.

Personal life
In 1989, Elliott married María Antonia Martín and has two children, both of whom were born in Madrid. 
He enjoys cricket and has played at the Cartama Oval in Málaga.

See also

 Embassy of the United Kingdom, Madrid

References

1965 births
Living people
People from Bedfordshire
People educated at Bedford School
Alumni of Trinity College, Cambridge
British civil servants
Ambassadors of the United Kingdom to Spain
Members of HM Diplomatic Service
20th-century British diplomats
21st-century British diplomats